The three-banded butterflyfish (Chaetodon robustus) is a species of fish in the family Chaetodontidae.

It inhabits the eastern-central Atlantic Ocean, in warm tropical waters from Mauritania down to Cape Verde and the Gulf of Guinea. It is present in coral reefs, from 30 to 70 meters deep. Its maximum length is 14.5 cm.

References

three-banded butterflyfish
Fish of the East Atlantic
Marine fauna of West Africa
three-banded butterflyfish
Taxa named by Albert Günther
Taxonomy articles created by Polbot